Vance Gilbert (born in Philadelphia, Pennsylvania, United States) is an American folk singer-songwriter. He started as a jazz singer, switched to folk music, became a regular on the open mike circuit in Boston and toured with Shawn Colvin. He has recorded thirteen albums, including Side of the Road, three of them on Philo/Rounder Records.

Raised in Willingboro Township, New Jersey, Gilbert graduated from Connecticut College.

Gilbert is known for his improvisational rapport with audiences during his shows. He speaks, as he sings, with sincerity and depth. He has a wide range, covering Joni Mitchell one moment and doing what sounds like a jazz classic (but is actually his own) the next. Many songs, such as "Old White Men", "Charlene", and (perhaps his personal favorite) "Unfamiliar Moon" tell profound stories and touch on important topics.  Many of his other tunes, such as "Goodbye Pluto" and "Waiting For Gilligan" take familiar stories from contemporary headlines and from popular culture and approach them in a whimsical and beautiful way.

Discography
 Here I'm Waiting (1985)
 Face to Face (1989)
 Edgewise (1994)
 Fugitives (1995)
 Shaking Off Gravity (1998)
 Somerville Live (2000)
 One Thru Fourteen (2002)
 Side of the Road (with Ellis Paul) (2003)
 Unfamiliar Moon (2005)
 Angels, Castles, Covers (2006)
 Up On Rockfield (2008)
 Old White Men (2011)
 BaD Dog Buffet (2014)
 Nearness of You (2015)
 Good Good Man (2020)

References

External links
 

Year of birth missing (living people)
Living people
21st-century African-American male singers
African-American songwriters
Fast Folk artists
Musicians from Philadelphia
Connecticut College alumni
People from Willingboro Township, New Jersey
Songwriters from Pennsylvania
American male songwriters